Dębiny  is a village in the administrative district of Gmina Opole Lubelskie, within Opole Lubelskie County, Lublin Voivodeship, in eastern Poland.

In 2005 the village had a population of 170.

References

Villages in Opole Lubelskie County